Billie Jean King defeated the defending champion Evonne Goolagong in the final, 6–3, 6–3 to win the women's singles title at the 1972 French Open. With the win, she completed the career Grand Slam in singles.

The French Lawn Tennis Federation halved the size of the draw from 64 to 32 players in an attempt to attract the top players on tour to the tournament; this change was reverted the following year as results were mixed.

Seeds
The seeded players are listed below. Billie Jean King is the champion; others show the round in which they were eliminated.

 Evonne Goolagong (Runner-up)
 Nancy Gunter (withdrew)
 Billie Jean King (champion)
 Rosemary Casals (first round)
 Françoise Dürr (semifinals)
 Virginia Wade (quarterfinals)
 Helga Niessen Masthoff (semifinals)
 Linda Tuero (first round)

Qualifying

Draw

Key
 Q = Qualifier
 WC = Wild card
 LL = Lucky loser
 r = Retired

Finals

Earlier rounds

Section 1

Section 2

Section 3

Section 4

Section 5

Section 6

Section 7

Section 8

References

External links
1972 French Open – Women's draws and results at the International Tennis Federation

Women's Singles
French Open by year – Women's singles
French Open - Women's Singles
1972 in women's tennis
1972 in French women's sport